A Spirit of Tolerance: The Inspiring Life of Tierno Bokar is the only English translation of Amadou Hampate Ba’s book Vie en enseignement de Tierno Bokar, le sage de Bandiagara (The Life and Education of Tierno Bokar, the Sage of Bandiagara), originally written in French. This book describes the life of Tierno Bokar, a Malian Sufi who preached a message of religious tolerance. It was adapted into a play directed by Peter Brook titled Tierno Bokar.

Malian literature
Books of Islamic biography
2008 non-fiction books